Waugh is a surname ( or , or the Scots pronunciation sounding like "Woch" as in the Scots "Loch" (Lake) derived from the proto-Germanic Walhaz), and may refer to:

Ainsley Waugh (born 1981), Jamaican athlete
 Andrew Scott Waugh (1810–1878), British Indian surveyor
Arthur Waugh (1866–1943), English author and publisher (father of Alec and Evelyn)
Alec Waugh (1898–1981), British novelist
Evelyn Waugh (1903–1966), British novelist
Auberon Waugh (1939–2001), British journalist and satirist (father of Alexander and Daisy)
Alexander Waugh (born 1963), British writer and journalist
Daisy Waugh (born 1967), British novelist and journalist
Arthur Waugh (priest) (1840–1922), English Anglican cleric
Arthur Waugh (civil servant) (1891–1968), British civil servant in India and folklorist
Arthur James Waugh (1909–1995)), Lord Mayor of Coventry 1962 and City Father
Barratt Waugh (born 1979), British countertenor singer
Benjamin Waugh (1839–1908), Victorian social reformer
Beverly Waugh (1789–1858), American bishop
Brian Kynaston Waugh (1922–1984), New Zealand aircraft designer
Bronagh Waugh (born 1982), a Northern Irish actress 
Catherine Waugh McCulloch (1862–1945), American lawyer and suffragist
Clifton Waugh (born 1972), Jamaican footballer
David Waugh (1866–unknown), English professional footballer
Daniel Waugh (historian), American academic affiliated with the University of Washington in Seattle
Daniel W. Waugh (1842–1921), American representative from Indiana
Dean Waugh (born 1969), Australian cricketer, brother of Mark and Steve Waugh
Derek Waugh (born 1971), American athletics director at Dalton State College
Ed Waugh, British dramatist (collaborates with Trevor Wood)
Edward "Terry" Walter Rail Waugh (1913–1966), South African architect
Edwin Waugh (1817–1890), English poet
Frank Albert Waugh (1869–1943), American landscape architect, father of Frederick V.
Albert E. Waugh (1903–1985), American economist and provost of the University of Connecticut and son of Frank Albert
Frederick V. Waugh (1898–1974), American agricultural economist, son of Frank Albert and father of Margaret
Margaret Maxfield (née Waugh, 1926–2016), American mathematician, daughter of Frederick V.
Fred Waugh (1869–1919), Australian rules footballer
Geoff Waugh (born 1983), Canadian-Croatian ice hockey player
Hillary Waugh (1920–2008), American mystery novelist
Howard Waugh (1931–2009)), Canadian Football League player and 1st 1,000-yard rusher
Hubert Waugh (1898–1954), English cricketer
Ida Waugh (1846–1919), American illustrator
James Waugh (1831–1905), Scottish racehorse trainer
James Swanton Waugh (1822–1898), Australian Wesleyan priest of Irish origin 
Jeff Waugh, Australian software engineer
Jewell Waugh (1910–2006), American politician
Jim Waugh (1933–2010), American baseball player (pitcher)
Jimmy Waugh (1898–1968)), British footballer
Joan Waugh, American historian
John Waugh (disambiguation), multiple individuals
Joseph Waugh (born 1952), British cyclist
Joseph Laing Waugh (1868–1928), Scottish businessman and writer
Keith Waugh (born 1956), English-born footballer, whose clubs included Peterborough United and Bristol City
Kevin Waugh (born 1955 or 1956), Canadian politician and former television sports journalist
Kim Waugh, Australian horse trainer
Mark Waugh (born 1965), Australian cricketer (twin brother of Steve)
Maury Waugh, American football (gridiron) coach 
Mike Waugh (1955–2014), American politician
Michael Waugh (artist), American artist known for satirical drawings
Norman Waugh (1874–1934)), Australian rules footballer
Patricia Waugh (born 1956), English literary critic, Professor of English at Durham University
Phil Waugh (born 1979), Australian rugby union footballer
Pia Waugh (now known as Pia Andrews, born 1979), Australian policy advisor
Reuben Waugh (1875–1945), Canadian politician
Richard Deans Waugh (1868–1938), Canadian politician
Richard E. Waugh (born 1947), Deputy Chairman of Scotiabank
Ric Roman Waugh (born 1968), American film director
Richard Waugh (born 1961), voice actor
Robert T. Waugh (1919–1944), American Army Officer, Medal of Honor recipient
Russell Waugh (born 1941), Australian cricketer
Samuel Waugh (1814–1885), American painter
Frederick Judd Waugh (1861–1940), American marine painter and camouflage artist, son of Samuel
Coulton Waugh (1896–1973), British cartoonist, painter and author, son of Frederick Judd
Samuel C. Waugh (1890–1970), American banker, official with the U.S. Department of State
Scott L. Waugh (born 1948), American historian and academic administrator. 
Scott Waugh (born 1970 or 1971), American film director
Sidney Waugh (1904–1963), American sculptor
Steve Waugh (born 1965), Australian cricketer (twin brother of Mark)
Sylvia Waugh (born 1935), British children's writer
Sir Telford Waugh (1865–1950)), British diplomat
Thomas Frederick Waugh, Canadian politician
Thomas Waugh (born 1948), Canadian critic, Film studies professor at Concordia University 
Warwick Waugh (born 1968), Australian rugby union player
Warren Waugh (born 1980), English footballer
William Waugh (disambiguation), multiple people

You may be looking for
Dhondia Wagh (died 1800), also known as Dhoondiah Waugh, Indian soldier

English-language surnames
Surnames of Lowland Scottish origin